Astatochroa is a genus of moths belonging to the subfamily Drepaninae.

Species
 Astatochroa fuscimargo (Warren, 1896)
 Astatochroa sulphurata (Warren, 1907)

References

Drepaninae
Drepanidae genera